The Muslim Bansphor are a Muslim community found in the state of Uttar Pradesh in India.  They are Muslim converts from the Hindu Bansphor caste.

Present circumstances

The Bansphor practice strict community endogamy, and like other neighbouring Muslim groups, have a preference of marrying close kin. They practice both parallel cousin and cross cousin marriages.  Although the Bansphor live in multi-caste villages, but occupy their own distinct quarters, and there is little interaction with neighbouring[Muslim groups such as the Ranghar, Shaikh and Ansari. Each of their settlement contains an informal caste council, known as a panchayat. The panchayat is headed by a chaudhary, a position which is heredity. In addition, there is an overarching panchayat of between three and four villages, which headed by a chaudhary. The panchayat resolves any intra-community dispute, as well as acting an instrument of social control.  They Bansphor are Sunni Muslims, but incorporate many folk beliefs.

See also
Muslim Bandhmati

References

Muslim communities of Uttar Pradesh